Abbeyville may refer to:

 Abbeyville, Colorado, United States, an unincorporated community
 Abbeyville, Ohio, United States, an unincorporated community

See also
 Abbyville, Kansas
 Abbeville (disambiguation)